Vespola is a genus of moths of the family Noctuidae. The genus was erected by Francis Walker in 1867.

Species
 Vespola caeruleifera Walker, 1867
 Vespola plumipes Schaus, 1912
 Vespola similissima Schaus, 1915

References

Agaristinae